Mobarakabad (also Romanized as Mobārakābād; also known as Mubārakābād) is a village in Madar Soleyman Rural District, Hakhamanish District, Pasargad County, Fars Province, Iran. At the 2006 census, its population was 1,077, in 235 families.

References 

Populated places in Pasargad County